The Chikamin Range is a subrange of the Tahtsa Ranges, located between the west end of Eutsuk Lake and Whitesail Lake in northern British Columbia, Canada.

References

Chikamin Range in the Canadian Mountain Encyclopedia

Hazelton Mountains
Nechako Country